Kenneth Broberg (born August 2, 1993) is an American classical pianist. In June 2017 he won the silver medal at the Fifteenth Van Cliburn International Piano Competition. In June 2019 Broberg earned the third prize and bronze medal at The XVI International Tchaikovsky Competition. In June 2021 he received the American Pianists Association award.

Early life and musical education 
Broberg was born and raised in Minneapolis. Interested by the upright piano in his family home that was a wedding gift to his parents from his maternal grandparents, he began playing piano at the age of 6. At 9, he began studying piano with Dr. Joseph Zins at Crocus Hill Studios in Saint Paul, Minnesota. He went on to study with Nancy Weems at the University of Houston's Moores School of Music, where he earned a Bachelor of Music degree in 2016.

Broberg is a graduate student at Park University in Parkville, Missouri, studying with Stanislav Ioudenitch, who was a gold medalist at the Eleventh Van Cliburn International Piano Competition in 2001.

Professional career

Broberg was featured on NPR’s radio program for young musicians, From the Top, two times early in his career at the age of 16. He has since been broadcast on other radio stations across the world including ABC in Australia and KUHF in Houston, Texas.

Broberg has performed as guest soloist with orchestras around the world including the Royal Philharmonic Orchestra, Minnesota Orchestra, Seattle Symphony, Fort Worth Symphony Orchestra, and Sydney Symphony Orchestra. He also performs solo recitals both on concert series and at festivals including the International Keyboard Odyssiad and Festival, the Rye Arts Festival in the United Kingdom, and New Orleans Keyboard Festival.

In addition to many other wins at international piano competitions, Broberg won the fourth prize at the Sydney International Piano Competition in 2016; several of his performances from that competition were included on CDs released on the Universal Music Australia label.

On June 10, 2017, Broberg gained international attention by winning the silver medal at the prestigious Fifteenth Van Cliburn International Piano Competition. Broberg had been invited to the live competition in Fort Worth, Texas along with 29 other competitors from a pool of 290 applicants. Broberg progressed through each of the four rounds which required two 45-minute solo recitals, one 60-minute solo recital, a piano quintet with the Brentano String Quartet, and a Mozart piano concerto with the Fort Worth Symphony Orchestra and Nicholas McGegan, and he chose to end the final round by performing Rachmaninoff’s Rhapsody on a Theme of Paganini with the Fort Worth Symphony Orchestra and Leonard Slatkin. As a result of winning the silver medal, Broberg received $25,000 cash, three years of career management, a live recording, a recording partnership with Universal Music Group, press kits, videos, and a website.

As part of his Competition prizes, Decca Gold released his debut solo album on August 18, 2017, Cliburn Silver 2017, featuring a selection of Broberg’s live performances during the Competition.

Awards

Discography

See also
 Van Cliburn International Piano Competition
 Fifteenth Van Cliburn International Piano Competition
 International Tchaikovsky Competition

References

External links
 
 Cliburn profile

American classical pianists
Male classical pianists
American male pianists
Living people
1993 births
Prize-winners of the Van Cliburn International Piano Competition
Musicians from Minneapolis
University of Houston alumni
21st-century classical pianists
21st-century American pianists
Classical musicians from Minnesota
21st-century American male musicians
Prize-winners of the International Tchaikovsky Competition